The Kansas State High School Activities Association (KSHSAA) is the organization which oversees interscholastic competition in the U.S. state of Kansas at the high-school level. It oversees both athletic and non-athletic competition, and sponsors championships in several sports and activities.

History
The Kansas State High School Activities Association was formed in 1937 and incorporated in 1956. As early as 1910, Kansas schools organized the statewide Debate League and Athletic Association governed by high school principals. The Athletic Association started as a small voluntary group of fewer than 50 schools and grew to more than 500 schools by the 1920s. Out of necessity, the member schools adopted eligibility and participation rules and established authority for a Board of Control to assess penalties against schools for violations. In 1927 the Board of Control employed the first full-time Executive Secretary. To date, six individuals have served as executive director.

Classification
KSHSAA divides schools based upon enrollment of grades 9, 10, 11 and 12 for competition and state and regional championships. The largest 32 schools in the state are class 6A, the next largest 32 become 5A, the next 64 become 4A, 3A, and 2A respectively and the remaining schools become class 1A. These classes are re-evaluated every year for all activities except football, with new classifications announced in September after the start of the school year. Ninth grade students were not counted toward the annual classification totals from 1967 to 1968 through 2010–11.  In 2013, the 64 schools in class 4A voted to split into two divisions for volleyball, baseball, basketball, softball, and football.

Starting with the 2018–19 school year, Classes 6A, 5A and 4A will consist of 36 schools each. Classes 3A and 2A will continue to have 64 schools each, while the remaining schools will be in 1A. The two-division format which currently exists in 1A for basketball, scholars bowl and volleyball, and in 4A for baseball, basketball, softball and volleyball, will be eliminated.

Football is evaluated biannually based only upon enrollment for grades 9, 10, and 11, with classifications for the next two seasons announced in October of an odd-numbered year. Schools with 100 or fewer students in grades 9-11 have the option to play Eight-man football instead of the traditional 11-man game. In 11-man football, there are five classes (6A, 5A, 4A, 3A, 2-1A), with 32 schools in 6A and 5A, 64 schools in 4A and 3A, and the remaining schools (43 for 2010 and 2011; 41 for 2012 and 2013) in 2-1A. In eight-man football, there are two divisions of roughly equal size, with 105 schools scheduled to compete in 8-man for the 2010 and 2011 seasons, decreasing to 104 for 2012 and 2013 due to consolidation in many rural towns.

Beginning in 2018, Classes 6A, 5A and 4A will have 32 schools in each classification for football, with the two-division format in 4A eliminated. Classes 3A and 2A will have 48 schools each, and Class 1A will have the remaining 11-man football playing schools (31 in 2018 and 2019). 8-man Division I will be limited to 48 schools, with the remainder in 8-man Division II.

The KSHSAA did not sponsor state championship playoffs for football until 1969. District play was introduced to determine playoff participants in 1981. From 1981 through 2001, only district champions advanced to the playoffs. In 2002, the top two teams in each 11-man district began to qualify for the playoffs; district runners-up were added to the playoff brackets for 8-man in 2004.

In 2016, districts were abolished in Classes 5A and 6A. In those classifications, teams now schedule the first eight games on their own, with the ninth week acting as the first week of the playoffs. Teams are seeded onto the bracket based upon overall record and divided into two groups of 16 based upon geography. Beginning in 2018 the same format was adopted in Class 4A.

Schools form leagues to compete against one another, and participation in a particular league is voluntary. Most schools in a league are located within a close geographic range. The most notable example is in Wichita, where the nine high schools within the city limits form the Greater Wichita Athletic League (GWAL, more commonly known as the City League). However, due to sparse population in western Kansas, schools in the same league are often separated by distances of more than 100 miles, and in a few cases, schools are almost 200 miles apart.

In some sports and activities where not all small schools may field a team, classifications are combined for purposes of state championships. For example, in policy debate, there are state championships for 6A, 5A, 4A, and 3-2-1A combined.

Historical classifications

Basketball:
 2021 to present: 6A, 5A, 4A, 3A, 2A, 1A-Division I, 1A-Division II
 2019 to 2020: 6A, 5A, 4A, 3A, 2A, 1A
 2014 to 2018: 6A, 5A, 4A-Division I, 4A-Division II, 3A, 2A, 1A-Division I, 1A-Division II
 2011 to 2013: 6A, 5A, 4A, 3A, 2A, 1A-Division I, 1A-Division II
 1969 to 2010: 6A, 5A, 4A, 3A, 2A, 1A
 1952 to 1968: AA, A, BB, B
 1941 to 1951: AA, A, B
 1931 to 1940: A, B

Football:
 2022 to present: 6A, 5A, 4A, 3A, 2A, 1A, 8-man Division I, 8-man Division II, 6-man
 2018 to 2021: 6A, 5A, 4A, 3A, 2A, 1A, 8-man Division I, 8-man Division II
 2014 to 2017:  6A, 5A, 4A-Division I, 4A-Division II, 3A, 2-1A, 8 Man-Division I, 8 Man-Division II 
 1985 to 2013: 6A, 5A, 4A, 3A, 2-1A, 8 Man-Division I, 8 Man-Division II
 1983 to 1984: 6A, 5A, 4A, 3A, 2A, 1A, 8 Man-Division I, 8 Man-Division II
 1978 to 1982: 6A, 5A, 4A, 3A, 2A, 1A, 8 Man
 1969 to 1977: 5A, 4A, 3A, 2A, 1A, 8 Man

Events
The association's largest event is the Kansas State track and field championships, which are held the weekend before Memorial Day at Cessna Stadium on the campus of Wichita State University. The meet, which features athletes from schools in all six classes, is one of the nation's largest high school meet, with more than 3,300 athletes participating. The state track meet hosted its 100th competition in 2010. Former GWAL Athletic Director and current Assistant Superintendent of Wichita Public Schools, Bill Faflick holds the position of Meet Director and has been widely praised for his direction of the meet.

The eight-man football championships are held the Saturday before Thanksgiving, while the 11-man football title games are held the Saturday after Thanksgiving, ensuring the football season ends before December 1. The games are held at various sites across the state, with current sites including Fort Hays State University in Hays, Pittsburg State University in Pittsburg, and Hutchinson Community College in Hutchinson, as well as high school stadiums in Salina and Topeka. The eight-man championships have been held at Fischer Field in Newton since 2006, while the 6-man championship is at Dodge City.

Kansas is one of the few states, especially in the Midwest, that holds state football championship games at different sites. State championships in Illinois, Indiana, Iowa, Michigan, Minnesota, Nebraska, North Dakota, Ohio, South Dakota, and Wisconsin are held at a single central location. Missouri holds its title games at the same site on two separate weekends.

The state basketball championships are held the second week of March, with girls and boys competition taking place at the same time. The sites for the six classes remained constant from 1990 through 2010, with 6A at Wichita State, 5A at the Kansas Expocenter in Topeka, 4A at the Bicentennial Center in Salina, 3A at the Hutchinson Sports Arena, 2A at Bramlage Coliseum on the KSU campus, and 1A at Fort Hays State's Gross Memorial Coliseum. The 4A, 3A and 1A tournaments began at their current locations in 1980.

In 2011, the 6A tournament moved to Charles Koch Arena on the campus of Wichita State University, with Emporia taking over the Class 1A-Division I tournament. The 1A-Division II tournament remained at Hays. 

Emporia currently hosts the Class 5A tournament, with 6A,. 4A, 3A and 2A remaining at Wichita, Salina, Hutchinson and Manhattan, respectively. The 1A-Division I state tournament is at Dodge City and the 1A-Division II tournament is at Barton Community College in Great Bend. 

State championships for baseball and softball are held at the same time as the track championship, usually at community colleges or large recreational fields, although some championships have been held at Lawrence–Dumont Stadium in Wichita, home of the National Baseball Congress tournament and the American Association of Independent Professional Baseball's Wichita Wingnuts, as well as Hoglund Ballpark at KU in Lawrence. The 2011 Class 6A tournament was hosted by KU, and the 5A tournament was hosted by Wichita State at Eck Stadium.

State championships for wrestling are held in late February every year. Up until 2005, classes 6, 5, and 4A held separate but concurrently running tournaments at the Kansas Coliseum in Wichita, Kansas, while 3-2-1A held their tournament at Gross Memorial Coliseum in Hays. After that year, KSHSAA began looking for alternative sites for the classes to hold their tournaments for a number of reasons, including remodeling which was to begin on the Coliseum in the following years.

In 2006, 4A left 5A and 6A and held its own tournament at the Bicentennial Center in Salina, Kansas, while the other classes stayed at their respective sites. In the 2007–08 season, each of the 4 classes competed in 4 separate facilities, as the Coliseum was not be available. 3-2-1A and 4A remained in Hays and Salina respectively, while 6A moved to Charles Koch Arena at Wichita State University and 5A moved to Hutchinson High School.

The 2009 6A and 5A championships returned to the Kansas Coliseum, but only for a one-year contract. The 2010 5A and 6A state wrestling tournaments were held at the Intrust Bank Arena. The 2011 6A and 5A state championships were moved to the Hartman Arena in Park City, Kansas, and will continue there in 2012.

Kansas held its first girls wrestling championships in 2020 at Salina. The next year, girls were split into two divisions, with Classes 5A and 6A at Park City and Classes 1A through 4A at Salina. 

Due to Kansas's cold climate in the winter, the championships for golf, tennis, and soccer are split. Girls compete in golf and tennis in the fall and soccer in the spring, while boys compete in soccer in the fall and golf and tennis in the spring. Boys' golf teams may compete in grass green (traditional) or sand green competition. Girls who attend schools without golf, tennis, and soccer teams are allowed to play on the boys' teams at the school.

Sanctioned activities
KSHSAA classifies its activities into athletic and non-athletic events.

 Non-Athletic Events
 Policy Debate
 Kansas Association for Youth
 Music
 Piano
 Scholar's Bowl
 Speech & Drama
 Spirit Activities
 Student Council

 Athletic Events

 Baseball
 Bowling
 Basketball
 Cross Country
 Football
 Golf
 Girls Gymnastics
 Soccer
 Softball
 Swimming & Diving
 Tennis
 Track & Field
 Girls Volleyball
 Wrestling

Criticism
KSHSAA has been criticized for its 6A-1A format. Similar sized states, including neighboring Missouri do not have as many classifications, but have more total schools. This over-classification has been deemed a "watered down effect". Many rural schools argue the current classification structure favors schools in larger cities, especially in Classes 5A and 4A, where the discrepancy between the classification numbers is quite large. For the 2008–09 school year, the largest Class 4A school had more than 2.5 times the number of students as the smallest school in the classification.

It has been suggested by many Kansas High School supporters (most specifically in basketball) that 5A and 6A should combine to form one 64 team classification. Other plans call for the 16 biggest 5A schools to jump to 6A. The idea is opposed by schools in the state's three major metropolitan areas (Kansas City, Topeka and Wichita), since the vast majority of 5A and 6A schools are in those areas. Of the 32 Class 6A schools, 13 are located in Johnson County, the state's most populous county with approximately 17 percent of Kansas's population.

Leagues
There are currently 40 leagues that are accepted by the Kansas State High School Activities Association.

 Approved School (non-KSHAA member schools with approval to play KSHSAA members)
 Ark Valley Chisholm Trail League I
 Ark Valley Chisholm Trail League II
 Ark Valley Chisholm Trail League III
 Ark Valley Chisholm Trail League IV
 Big Seven
 Centennial
 Central Kansas
 Central Plains
 Central Prairie
 CNC (Cherokee-Neosho-Crawford)
 Eastern Kansas
 Flint Hills
 Frontier
 Great West Activities Conference
 Greater Wichita (Wichita City League)
 Heart of America
 Heart of the Plains
 Hi-Plains
 Independent
 Lyon County
 Meadowlark Conference (formerly KCAL)
 Mid-Continent
 Mid-East
 North Central Activities Association
 North Central Kansas
 Northeast Kansas
 Northern Plains
 Northwest Kansas
 Pioneer
 Santa Fe Trail
 South Central Border
 Southeast Kansas
 SPAA-Iroquois Activity Assoc.
 Sunflower
 Three Rivers
 Tri-Valley
 Twin Valley
 United Kansas Conference
 Western Athletic Conference
 Western Kansas Liberty
 Wheat State

See also
 NFHS

References

External links
 KSHSAA Official website
 Kansas School District Boundary Maps, KSDE

Sports organizations established in 1937
High school sports associations in the United States
Organizations based in Topeka, Kansas
High school sports in Kansas
Education in Topeka, Kansas
1937 establishments in Kansas